Donald "Don" Eppes is a fictional character and one of the protagonists of the CBS crime drama Numb3rs. He is portrayed by Rob Morrow.

Don is an FBI Special Agent who runs the FBI Violent Crimes Squad in Los Angeles. Don recruits his mathematical genius brother, Charlie Eppes, to help him and the Bureau solve some of their most difficult cases. Don makes great sacrifices in his personal life in order to devote himself to his career, which to him is more of a way of life than a mere job.  More important to him than his work is his family, especially Charlie, even though he doesn't understand his brother's way of looking at the world.

Backstory
Don is the older son of Alan Eppes and Margaret Mann-Eppes.  He was raised in a secular Jewish family. During the Vietnam War, his parents would take him to sit-ins, and he twice watched his father be arrested (as mentioned in the episode "Protest"). When Don became too attached to his toy gun, his parents put him in Little League, hoping Don would forget his love for guns. Don graduated high school on the same day as his younger brother Charlie, who is five years younger ("Soft Target"). He went to college on a baseball scholarship and then played Single-A with the Stockton Rangers (a fictional team) as a utility player. Charlie used to predict the number of walks he would get just from his stance at the plate. Despite the attraction, Don never took steroids, although his backup player did. That player made the major leagues and Don has since wondered if he should have taken steroids to help improve his game. The day after realizing that he would never be better than a single A player, Don quit the Rangers and signed up for the FBI entrance exam ("Identity Crisis").

In the FBI Academy, he dated fellow agent Terry Lake. As he later told his father, his favorite date ever was when he had pizza in a laundromat with her. Terry does not share that opinion. After graduating from the Academy, Don worked in Fugitive Recovery with Billy Cooper (episode "Man Hunt") and former Navy SEAL Petey Fox ("Friendly Fire") and was very good at it. He taught at the FBI Academy for a time after Fugitive Recovery to help him come back to civilization ("Longshot"). After that, he worked in the field office in Albuquerque, New Mexico, and dated Kim Hall (Sarah Wayne Callies), and nearly married her.

Don gave up his position as Special Agent in Charge of the Albuquerque FBI office to move back to L.A. when his mother became ill with cancer, from which she eventually died.

Characterization
Don is a principled character and very devoted to his job, leaving him not much time for a social life. According to actor Rob Morrow, Don has a tendency to sacrifice, even at the expense of what he wants from life.  He enjoys the occasional game of baseball and is also often seen watching ice hockey, which he played in his youth. He went to college on a baseball scholarship. Don thought baseball was his first love, though his father Alan Eppes reminded him that a toy gun and playing a cop as a child was actually his first love, and comforted him in noticing that the FBI needs utility players. Charlie said that he was a "born cop." Don's giving up on the game is an emotional subject for him.

He and Charlie have had their differences over the years, and Don finds it hard to go to Charlie for help to do his job. In fact, in "One Hour" Don states that he does not like living in the shadow of his genius brother, though he respects him and his abilities very much and they have become closer. Sometimes, he feels that Charlie isn't doing all the great things he could be doing because he is working with the FBI. Still, he does often question his brother only to have his faith in Charlie's abilities restored. In "Burn Rate", their father says, "But have you ever known your brother to let his emotions trump his math?" Just because Don gets emotional, he thought this was the case with Charlie and even stated his brother was backing one of his own. In "Trust Metric", Charlie says that he has a giant ego.

He is a harsh taskmaster, likes being the boss, and is not very forgiving. One of his former tactical trainees from Quantico, Liz Warner has proclaimed to this and, after Colby confided in her that he made a mistake, she told him that the very fact that he still remains on Don's team means something. She also said that Don never spoke of his personal life while at the FBI Academy and was at the time fresh from the field in hunting fugitives (with friend Agent Cooper). Liz knows he has mellowed with age and he can hold a commitment with a woman for longer periods of time.

He believes that the death penalty is a form of revenge.

Don has an ability to understand how criminals think, which causes him to suppress his thoughts in an effort to cope with the horrors that he sees on his job.

Don's main weapon of choice is a Glock 19.

Evolution over the series
Having been Special Agent In Charge of the Albuquerque Office, Don took a demotion in order to obtain a position as Special Agent in the L.A. Field Office, but he did so to be with his family when his mother was diagnosed with cancer two years prior to the series pilot.  Margaret Eppes died approximately one year later, and according to the pilot, Don elicited Charlie's help on two cases between her death and the series pilot.  These cases involved IRS extortion and stock fraud.  Initially uncertain about what Charlie might actually be able to contribute, he reluctantly allows Charlie to assist with their attempts to track down a rapist and is pleasantly surprised when Charlie's math leads to the suspect's apprehension ("Pilot").

His relationship with Charlie was apparently somewhat strained even before their mother's death, as Don is stunned to learn that his little brother has enough security clearance to work with both the CDC and the NSA ("Vector").  He is even more surprised to discover that Charlie doesn't seem to know that his clearance will allow him to walk into the L.A. Office whenever he wishes, rather than obtaining a visitor's pass every time and being restricted in what he can do there.  Upon resolving Charlie's status, Don now apparently calls Charlie in on most of his cases.

In "Uncertainty Principle", Don loses his temper at Charlie when Charlie once again reverts to working on P vs. NP after Don is shot in the arm by the 'Charm School Boys'.  He vents his frustration and anger at Charlie for hiding in his math (members of the fandom refer to this state as 'Numbersville').  In "Vector", Don comforts Charlie when Charlie questions Don heartbrokenly about whether their mother was in pain during those last three months, showing that despite his anger that Charlie wasn't there for her, he cannot help but protect Charlie from whatever is hurting him.

After Charlie found a classical music composition for the piano (an Etude in G minor) that their mother wrote under her maiden name and his father admits that music was one of Margaret's first loves, Don and his brother remember the piano lessons that she made them take. While Don jokes about the dreadful teacher they had, he and Charlie realize why it was so important to their mother. At the end of "Running Man", Don comes home and finds the sheet music his mother wrote on the table. He sits down and starts playing, hesitantly at first, as Charlie and Alan listen from the garage.

When Megan Reeves was kidnapped, Don pushed his ethics to the limit to get her back. While he did not personally beat a suspect, he had Special Agent Ian Edgerton interrogate the teenager for information on where Megan was being held. It is never shown or said what Edgerton did during the interrogation, but it is heavily implied that he may have used physical force, up to and including applying pressure to the gunshot wound through the teen's wrist; Don expressed concern to his father over being willing to go that far, even if he wasn't doing it himself. After this discussion, he convinced his father that it is good to have someone to come home to, and that is why he comes around the Craftsman house so often rather than staying at his apartment.

In "Provenance," Don began to wonder why their family was not more religious and wanted to get in touch with his relatives, especially his grandmother's cousin who escaped World War II. A victim of the Holocaust found solace when Don had given a stolen painting which held much sentimentality back to her. Prior to this she had said that he knew pain in losing his mother. All of this had surfaced deep emotions in Don. Also in this episode, Don has jokingly stated he was a "lost cause," when his father expressed a failure in parenting him. On the other hand, in the previous season's "Calculated Risk," Don showed a connection to a boy who had lost his mother, giving hope to Alan that he had done something right.

Don was once nearly married to a fellow agent named Kim Hall, but that relationship ended when he returned to L.A.  Owing to his distant demeanor and predilection for isolation, Charlie was unaware of this relationship. As Don's fiancée long ago, Kim Hall had a chance to come to know Don and observed that the brothers had "one part exuberance, two parts obsession," after she was assigned to a case working alongside the two. He had also once dated an ATF agent, and was pained to find out that she called him before she was killed. The prosecutor Nadine Hodges (Sarah Carter ) seems to be smitten with him and vice versa. In the episode "Guns and Roses", he decides to investigate his flirtation with AUSA Robin Brooks (Michelle Nolden ). In "Blackout," after Robin broke up with him, Don became involved in a brief romance with Special Agent Liz Warner, whom he remembers for having an issue with adrenaline and being wild. He often makes reference to the difficulties in maintaining a relationship, given his career, as does his family. Don is now actively pursuing his love interest in Liz Warner ("End of Watch"), something he has not done in a long time. She is initially hesitant about entering the relationship, especially given his reputation for short relationships.  Don persuades her that they can still have an active relationship despite both being FBI agents and both working out of the L.A. Office ("Finders Keepers"). In "One Hour", Don's therapist questioned his motives concerning this relationship, and Don defended his actions. His supervisors in the FBI are aware of the relationship but the consequences have not been revealed. Finally, in the episode "Graphic," it is revealed that Don broke up with Liz, and was very depressed about it. With "In Security," Don's secrecy and his unwillingness to reveal information regarding his relationship with a woman in the Witness Protection Program, Leah Wexford (Jennifer Riker), whom he knew in Albuquerque years ago, strained his relationship with Liz. He has spoken to his father on the matter.

In "Take Out," Don must see a therapist who is led to believe that he is "trigger happy." His father noted that this may be true, as he often shoots first. Further, Alan recalled how Don would take on others' burdens as a child and told him to get counseling, which he later willingly sought, especially considering that he viewed his life's work as a series of dirty deeds. In "One Hour", Don expressed that he doesn't have to trust his team, they have to trust him.  The exception to this may be Charlie, whom the therapist identified as a member of the team to Don's initial confusion.  It appears that Don considers Charlie more of an extension of himself than a member of his team, which may be true:  Charlie would likely not be involved in the volume of cases that he is if not for Don's continued requests for his assistance, despite the team's respect for Charlie's contributions. He also confessed to his psychiatrist that he "respects the Hell out of" Charlie for all that his brother does for the FBI, and that Charlie has never let them down despite often having the team's and Don's lives in his hands. When the psychiatrist pushes Don about his relationship with Charlie, indicating first that Don resents Charlie's presence at the FBI and then that Don enjoys having his little brother as his 'employee', Don vehemently snaps back and defends Charlie. This shows how far the relationship between the brothers has come, especially since being damaged by the unusual pressures of their childhood and the three months near the end of their mother's life that Charlie spent working on P vs. NP. The therapist reveals that Don has deep-seated fears of losing what he has worked for, together with self-esteem issues from growing up in Charlie's shadow and likely some abandonment issues as well. In "Money for Nothing", he acquiesces to the counselor's request to ask Charlie to come in for a visit. A looming issue was the day Charlie walked all the way home from a camping trip at the age of 8 (taken for Don's 13th birthday) just to get away from Don who did not want him sticking around. During the meeting, he learns that his brother was not as inept as he and his father thought and stated he likes working with Charlie. Both Don's therapist and Edgerton himself bring up the incident in which a suspect was tortured that nearly took Don over the edge ("One Hour" and "Pandora's Box"), but given the fact that it was done to obtain the whereabouts of a missing FBI agent, Don and Ian's superiors appear to be overlooking the matter for now.

He was distraught over his father working with him in "Under Pressure", fearing for his safety. His father though straightens him out and shows him that he can help, which garners Don's gratitude — this surprises Alan.

In "The Janus List", Don sympathizes with the brilliant cryptographer's desire to feel that his life had meaning, showing another side of him to his father, as he usually would not appreciate any sentiments of a criminal.

Though "Number-vision" (as it is called in the special features of the DVDs) usually only appears when Charlie's mind draws mathematical connections, it has been used twice to show Don's mind drawing connections in a similar fashion:

1)  During the pilot episode, Don was examining a crime scene relating to the investigation of a serial rapist.  While examining the position of cigarette butts on the scene, he suddenly drew several connections and determined the suspect's real motives for breaking his apparent pattern.

2)  During "The Janus List" (Season 3 Finale), Don is looking at pictures of the placement of explosive devices on a bridge in the L.A. office with Charlie.  Without warning, he sees a pattern in the explosives that translates into a musical scale, much to Charlie's surprise.  This pattern, though something he initially shrugged off as a coincidence, turned out to be part of the key to revealing the Janus list and Colby Granger's position as a spy for the Chinese government.

When Colby escapes in Trust Metric, Don is conflicted about tracking Colby, and does not know whether to trust him about his status as a triple agent. However, he and his team are hopeful and rescue him anyway. Prior to his escape, Don mulled over Granger's confession for five weeks.

In the episode "In Security," Don hides the level of intimacy he had with Leah Wexford and information contained in clearanced FBI files therein concerned, after she is killed. He appears close to her son, comforting him over his loss. Don feels overwhelmingly guilty, and so Charlie performs a Classification And Regression Tree (CART) analysis behind his back. The result shows that he was not responsible for her death, and that his assertions of such lessen Leah's bravery.

After protecting Robin Brooks, he has become close to her and they are dating again. In the season finale, he is upset that Charlie cannot help him anymore due to his extreme act of sending his friend's work to a terrorist. He drives off alone to another case.

When season five opens, Don asks Amita and Larry to help with the math since Charlie no longer had his clearance, which neither brother wants to fight for.  After Charlie helps the team find Don during a shootout on a mountainside and find a victim, Don decides to tell Charlie to ask for his clearance back.  When they do begin the process of getting Charlie's clearance back, Don learns that FBI Security Officer Carl McGowan (Keith Carradine) wants to open an investigation into Don instead of opening an investigation about Charlie's e-mail to Pakistan.  In the formal interview, Don tells McGowan to reinstate Charlie's clearance, or Don quits the FBI.  McGowan recommends disciplinary action against Don for his actions during the Crystal Hoyle and Clay Porter incidents, which Don expects.  When the ADIC overturns McGowan's recommendations about Charlie and Don, Don is glad that Charlie is working with him again but feels lost in regards to the recommendation concerning him.

The fight with McGowan, coupled with seeing a fellow agent reach out for a picture of his family before dying in a shootout, causes Don to explore Judaism.  His decision surprises his family and Robin.

Buck Winters breaks out of prison to go after Don, causing Don to fear that he may have to shoot Buck.  After Charlie tells him that he cannot go back in time and reverse his actions, Don then makes a plan to capture Buck alive.  Don, the team, and Buck go into the temple where Buck reveals that he wanted a death-by-cop.  The team arrest Buck.

When Charlie gets an offer from DARPA, he confides to Alan that he does not know whether he wants Charlie to take it.  Don later tells Charlie that there was a better offer with the FBI.  Don also teams up with Larry to tell Jane Karellen that Charlie was not taking DARPA up on their offer.

Toward the end of season five, David applies to be Don's primary relief supervisor.  Don first leaves the letter of recommendation on his desk for David to read.  After the request is granted and some on-the-job training in being Liz's handler, Don breaks the news about the request to David.

Don asks Charlie to help him during a home invasion case.  Charlie's results confirm the area that the suspects would hit next.  While checking out the property after a gun battle with the four suspects, a fifth man comes out and stabs Don, puncturing Don's left lung and nicking Don's pulmonary artery.  After Don is out of surgery, he goes into cardiac arrest and flatlines.  The doctors are able to revive him.  Don finally wakes up to Alan by his bedside.  Later, his team comes for a visit.  He tells them that he is allowed to return to desk duty initially and then full duty about a week later.

While recovering at home, Don realizes that his job does not influence him as much as it has in the past.  He shows concerns for Charlie's reaction to his stabbing.  About three weeks after the stabbing, Don goes to Charlie's new office for the first time, being pleased about Charlie's new office.  After finding Charlie's converted police scanner, Don cautions Charlie about the risk of burnout from police work.  Fifteen minutes after leaving, Don receives a phone call from Charlie saying that Amita has been kidnapped.  Throughout the investigation, Don keeps putting himself in Charlie's shoes and even asks Larry to help with the math.  When they find Amita, Don is the one to reunite Amita and Charlie.  At home, Don confides in Alan that he had his faith in God's existence shaken by the stabbing and that he does not know whether he wants to continue his spiritual journey.

Since the beginning of season 6, there are signs that Don becomes fragile and more hesitant. His chase toward a runaway sniper in season premiere and his hunt to a rogue agent in episode 2 are not as quick and overwhelming in previous seasons. He also admits that the stabbing really shocked him, meaning that he has more concern on his safety now. Although, he admits he has a "lost a step" to his father, not remembering when he has beaten David or Colby in a sprint, he is quick enough to kill his old, tough FBI pal Pete "Petey" Fox, who is an expert in a gunfight and has fallen to the wrong side of the law. He grieves the loss of his adrenaline-chasing friend.  In response to a mid-life crisis sparked by his stabbing and the loss of Petey, Don buys a motorcycle.
Midway through season six, he proposes to Robin.  She gets cold feet, stating that she felt he is still in the middle of significant changes in his life.  However, she tells him she will accept his proposal when he finds what he wants from life. In the sixth season finale, Don is at peace with himself after recovering his Glock and takes a head FBI position. He promises to remain close with Charlie, and re-proposes to Robin, which she accepts.

Creation
Don Eppes was created as Charlie's brother and as a link to the procedural part of the show.  Gabriel Macht originally was cast as Don Eppes in the original pilot of Numb3rs.  The believability of the family in terms of physical appearance and chemistry, however, created a need to recast the role.  Rob Morrow replaced Macht when Macht left the show.  At this point in development, Don was rewritten to be more intellectual than he was in the original pilot.  To prepare for his role as Don Eppes, Morrow did some training with the FBI as well as reading about and talking to real-life police officers.

Reception
Early critical reception of Don was mixed.  Gillian Flynn of Entertainment Weekly said that Morrow’s performance was “with full CSI-inspired stoicism”.  Melanie McFarland, TV critic for the Seattle Post-Intelligencer, stated that Don was not an original character as of the pilot.  Tim Goodman of the San Francisco Chronicle, however, called Morrow, as Don, “likable”.  Robert Bianco of USA Today stated that, although Don did not come across as an obvious choice of role for Morrow, Morrow was excellent as Don.

Since then, Don has been more widely accepted.  Morrow is now as recognized for his role as Don Eppes as he is for his role in Northern Exposure.  In a public service announcement, Morrow congratulated the Federal Bureau of Investigation on their 100th anniversary.  With 53 percent of the votes, Don took first place in the category of "Sexiest FBI Agent" in TV Guide's poll.

References

Numbers (TV series) characters
Fictional Federal Bureau of Investigation personnel
Fictional American Jews
Television characters introduced in 2005